Charles Edwin Brown Jr. (December 31, 1911 – August 23, 1996) was a major general and Chief of Chaplains of the United States Army.

Biography
Brown graduated from high school in Kiowa, Kansas in 1930. In 1934, he graduated from Southwestern College and married Ava Currier. The following year, he was ordained by the Methodist Episcopal Church.

Military career

During World War II, Brown served with the 3rd Infantry Division of the Fifth Army during the North African Campaign and the Italian Campaign. After the war, he was stationed at Fort Oglethorpe. Later, he attended the United States Army Command and General Staff College and became the first chaplain to attend the United States Army War College.

Brown became Chief of Chaplains in 1962 after being promoted to major general from colonel, bypassing the rank of brigadier general. He remained in the position until his retirement in 1967.

References

People from Kiowa, Kansas
Chiefs of Chaplains of the United States Army
American Methodist clergy
United States Army personnel of World War II
Southwestern College (Kansas) alumni
United States Army Command and General Staff College alumni
United States Army War College alumni
1911 births
1996 deaths
20th-century American clergy